Jo-Yu Chen is a Taiwanese jazz pianist and composer.

Life and career
Chen was born in Taiwan and initially studied classical music. She particularly listened to Romantic composers and moved aged 16 to New York's Juilliard School, mainly to study oboe. She became exposed to other kinds of music there, and became more interested in jazz. She later obtained a PhD in music education from Teachers College, Columbia University. She then continued her studies at The New School and took jazz piano lessons from Sam Yahel.

Chen's first album, Obsession, was released in 2009. This was followed three years later by another trio album, Incomplete Soul. In 2014, Chen, as "the first Taiwanese jazz artist signed to a major label", released Stranger, an album consisting largely of her original compositions.

Discography
An asterisk (*) indicates that the year is that of release.

As leader/co-leader

References

Jazz pianists
Living people
Year of birth missing (living people)
Okeh Records artists
Taiwanese pianists
Teachers College, Columbia University alumni
21st-century pianists
Juilliard School